Elisabeth Margaret Welch (February 27, 1904July 15, 2003) was an American singer, actress, and entertainer, whose career spanned seven decades. Her best-known songs were "Stormy Weather", "Love for Sale" and "Far Away in Shanty Town". She was American-born, but was based in Britain for most of her career.

Early life
According to her birth certificate, Welch was born at 223 West 61st Street in New York City. Her father was chief gardener of an estate in Englewood, New Jersey. Her father was of indigenous American and African American ancestry; her mother was of Scottish and Irish descent. Welch was brought up in a Baptist-Christian family, and began her singing in a church choir.

She first intended to go from high school into social work, but instead chose to become a professional singer. She started her career in New York in 1922, but in 1929 she went on to Europe – first to Paris and then to London.

Professional career
After her first appearance in America in Liza in 1922, Welch was the initial singer of the Charleston in the show Runnin' Wild (1923). During the 1920s she appeared in African-American Broadway theatre shows, including The Chocolate Dandies (1924) and Blackbirds of 1928. She made relatively few recordings. Before moving to Europe she made only one record – "Doin' The New Lowdown", b/w 'Digga Digga Do", as vocalist for the Irving Mills-assembled Hotsy Totsy Gang (Brunswick 4014, 27 July 1928).

"Blackbirds of 1928" was taken to the Moulin Rouge in Paris in 1929 and it was here that Welch began her career as a cabaret singer including performances at the popular nightclub Chez Florence.

Welch was asked to return to New York, where she replaced a singer in The New Yorkers (1930–1931) and sang Cole Porter's controversial song "Love for Sale". The composer met her afterwards in Paris, and then invited her to perform his song "Solomon" in Nymph Errant in London in 1933. That year, before this show was available, Welch was given permission to perform in London in Dark Doings, in which she sang "Stormy Weather", newly written by Harold Arlen and Ted Koehler. She subsequently took the song as her signature tune.

Welch's show-stopping performance in Nymph Errant was seen by Ivor Novello, and in 1935, he gave her a part in his show Glamorous Night, in which she stood out again singing his blues song "Far Away in Shanty Town". In 1931, she had included in her cabaret act the new song "As Time Goes By", almost a dozen years before it achieved screen fame in Casablanca. In 1936 she recorded vocals on a number of tracks arranged by Benny Carter, performed with his orchestra & swing quartet for the recording "When Lights Are Low". 

In the mid 1930s, Welch entered two media: she appeared in films – usually as a singer, and as leading lady to Paul Robeson in Song of Freedom and the musical Big Fella – and she was also one of the first artists to perform on British television, appearing on the BBC's new TV service from Alexandra Palace.

During World War II, she remained in London during the Blitz, and entertained the armed forces as a member of Sir John Gielgud’s company.

After the war she was in many West End theatre shows, including revues. She continued on both television and radio. She also had a series of one-woman shows until 1990. She was in the Royal Variety Performance in 1979 and 1985. In 1979, she was cast as a Goddess by Derek Jarman and sang "Stormy Weather" in his film version of Shakespeare's The Tempest.

In 1980, she returned to New York to appear in Black Broadway and she appeared there again in 1986 when her one-woman show Time to Start Living earned her an Obie Award. At the 40th Annual Tony Awards in 1986, she was nominated for Best Performance by a Featured Actress in a Musical for her performance in Jerome Kern Goes to Hollywood.

Welch was the subject of This Is Your Life in 1985 when she was surprised by Eamonn Andrews outside London's Palace Theatre.

Her final performance was in 1996 for Black Divas, a Channel 4 television documentary, in which she sang "Stormy Weather", at the age of 92. Her final public appearance was at a 1997 tribute concert for Daily Mail theatre critic Jack Tinker at the London Palladium, at the age of 93, she didn’t perform, but her attendance was announced and there was a standing ovation in her honour.

Personal life
In 1928, she was married to Luke Smith, a jazz musician, but they separated after a few months. They had no children and he died in 1936.

Welch died at the age of 99 at Denville Hall in Northwood, London on July 15, 2003.

Legacy
The Variety Club of Great Britain in 1988 recognised her with a Special Award for services to the entertainment industry.

In February 2012, writer Bonnie Greer unveiled an English Heritage blue plaque at Ovington Court in Kensington, London, where Welch lived from 1933 to 1936.

She was twice a guest on the BBC radio programme Desert Island Discs, on February 26, 1952, and November 18, 1990; her latter appearance is now part of the programme's online archive.

Theatrical performances

 Liza, 1922, on Broadway
 Runnin' Wild, 1923, on Broadway
 The Chocolate Dandies, 1924, on Broadway
 Blackbírds of 1928, 1928, on Broadway
 Blackbirds of 1929, 1929, at the Moulin Rouge, Paris
 Cabaret, 1930, at Chez Florence and Le Boeuf sur le Toit, Paris
 The New Yorkers, 1931, on Broadway
 Dark Doings, 1933, at Leicester Square Theatre, London
 Nymph Errant, 1933, at Adelphi Theatre, London
 Glamorous Night, 1935, at Drury Lane Theatre, London
 Let's Raise the Curtain, 1936, at Victoria Palace, London
 Its in the Bag, 1937, at Saville Theatre, London
 All the Best, 1938, at the Opera House Theatre, Blackpool
 No Time for Comedy, 1941, at Comedy Theatre, London
 Sky High, 1942, at Phoenix Theatre, London
 Happy and Glorious, 1944, at London Palladium, London
 Tuppence Coloured, 1947, revue, Globe Theatre, London
 Oranges and Lemons, 1949, revue, Globe Theatre, London
 Penny Plain, 1951, revue, St Martin's Theatre, London
 The Crooked Mile, 1959, Cambridge Theatre, London
 Cindy Ella, 1962, Garrick Theatre, London
 Pippin, 1973, Her Majesty's Theatre, London
 Black Broadway, 1980, Town Hall, New York
 Jerome Kern Goes to Hollywood, 1986, Ritz Theatre (now the Walter Kerr Theatre), New York
 Time to Start Living, 1986, Lucille Lortel Theatre, New York

Film performances

 Death at Broadcasting House (1934) as Herself
 Soft Lights and Sweet Music (1936) as Herself
 Song of Freedom (1936) as Ruth Zinga
 Calling All Stars (1937) as Herself
 Big Fella (1937) as 'Manda'
 Around the Town (1938) as Herself
 Over the Moon (1939) as Cabaret Singer
 This Was Paris (1942) as Cabaret Singer
 Alibi (1942) as Cabaret Singer
 Fiddlers Three (1944) as Thora
 Dead of Night (1945) as Beulah
 Our Man in Havana (1959) as Woman in Street
 Cleopatra (1960) as Children's Nurse in abandoned film
 Girl Stroke Boy (1971) as Mrs. Delaney
 Revenge of the Pink Panther (1978) as Mrs. Wu
 Arabian Adventure (1979) as Beggarwoman
 The Tempest (1979) as A Goddess (last appearance)

Further reading
 Peter Gammond, The Oxford Companion to Popular Music Oxford University Press, 1991.  
 Guinness Who's Who of Stage Musicals, ed. C. Larkin. Guinness – )
 Stephen Bourne, Elisabeth Welch – Soft Lights and Sweet Music (foreword by Ned Sherrin) (2005, Scarecrow Press) 
 Stephen Bourne, Deep Are the Roots - Trailblazers Who Changed Black British Theatre (2021, The History Press)

References

External links
 
 
 
 Photos

1904 births
2003 deaths
20th-century American actresses
Actresses from New Jersey
American expatriates in the United Kingdom
American film actresses
American musical theatre actresses
American people of Irish descent
American people of Scottish descent
American stage actresses
American television actresses
Traditional pop music singers
Singers from New Jersey
People from Englewood, New Jersey
20th-century American singers
20th-century American women singers
21st-century American women